Eagle When She Flies is the thirty-first solo studio album by American singer-songwriter Dolly Parton. It was released on March 7, 1991, by Columbia Records. The album was produced by Steve Buckingham and Gary Smith, with Parton serving as executive producer. It continues Parton's return to mainstream country sounds following 1989's White Limozeen. The album features collaborations with Lorrie Morgan and Ricky Van Shelton, with additional supporting vocals provided by Vince Gill and Emmylou Harris. The album was a commercial success, becoming Parton's first solo album to peak at number one on the Billboard Top Country Albums chart since 1980s 9 to 5 and Odd Jobs. It was certified Platinum in by the RIAA in 1992. The album spawned four singles, the most successful being "Rockin' Years" with Ricky Van Shelton, which topped the Billboard Hot Country Singles & Tracks chart. In support of the album, Parton embarked on the Eagle When She Flies Tour, her only concert tour of the 1990s.

Release and promotion
The album was released March 7, 1991, on CD, cassette, and LP.

Dolly Parton's duet with Shelton, "Rockin' Years", topped the country charts, and the follow-up single co-written by Carl Perkins, "Silver and Gold", was a #15 country single. Rounding out the hit singles was the title song "Eagle When She Flies", which only reached a #33 peak, despite spending 20 weeks on the Billboard Country Singles chart. Her duet with Lorrie Morgan, "Best Woman Wins", appeared simultaneously on Lorrie Morgan's 1991 album Something in Red. She co-wrote the song "Family" with Carl Perkins and "Wildest Dreams" with Mac Davis.

Critical reception
Frank King from Calgary Herald wrote, "Hot damn, she's back. Just when the world is ready to write off Dolly as a cupie doll incapable of anything but candy fluff pop albums and silly duets with Kenny Rogers, she wipes us out with an inspiring, heart-on-your-sleeve country classic. The guest list - Vince Gill, Patty Loveless, Emmylou Harris, Alison Krauss - is impressive, but it's Dolly that shines from start to finish. Most of the 11 tracks are self-penned and drip with honest-to-goodness emotion. Makes a fella proud to slide on his cowboy boots and declare he finally likes Dolly for more than her pin-up appearance."

Commercial performance
The album also topped the U.S. country albums charts, Parton's first solo album to reach the top in a decade (and her last to do so until 2016) and reached #24 on the pop albums charts. The album spent 73 weeks on the Billboard Top Country Albums chart. It was her first solo studio album to reach number one album in the United States after 1980's 9 to 5 and Odd Jobs.  The album's single week at number one interrupted what would otherwise have been an unbroken run of over 14 months in the top spot for Garth Brooks.

The album sold 74,000 copies in its first week. It ended up being certified Platinum by the Recording Industry Association of America. The album has sold 1.14 million copies as of July 2016.

Reissues
In 2009, Sony Music reissued Eagle When She Flies in a triple-feature CD set with White Limozeen and Slow Dancing with the Moon.

Track listing

Personnel 
Adapted from the album liner notes.

Dolly Parton – lead vocals
The Mighty Fine Band:
Mike Davis – organ
Richard Dennison – background vocals
Jimmy Mattingly – fiddle, mandolin
Jennifer O'Brien – background vocals
Gary Smith – piano, keyboards
Howard Smith – background vocals
Steve Turner – drums
Paul Uhrig – bass
Bruce Watkins – acoustic guitar
Kent Wells – electric guitar

Additional musicians
Sam Bacco – percussion
Romantic Roy Huskey – upright bass
Mark Casstevens – acoustic guitar, mandolin
Paddy Corcoran – acoustic guitar on "If You Need Me"
Glen Duncan – fiddle
Paul Franklin – steel, dobro
Steve Gibson – guitar, mandolin
Carl Jackson – acoustic guitar on "If You Need Me"
Joey Miskulin – accordion
Mark O'Connor – fiddle on "What a Heartache"
Allisa Jones Wall – hammer dulcimer

Additional vocalists
Lea Jane Berinati – background vocals
Paddy Corcoran – harmony vocals on "If You Need Me"
Joy Gardner – background vocals
Vince Gill – harmony vocals on "Silver and Gold"
Vicki Hampton – background vocals
Emmylou Harris – harmony vocals on "Country Road"
Carl Jackson – harmony vocals on "If You Need Me"
The Kid Connection  – additional background vocals on "Family"
Alison Krauss – harmony vocals on "If You Need Me"
Patty Loveless – harmony vocals on "Country Road"
Lewis Nunley – background vocals
John Wesley Ryles – background vocals
Lisa Silver – background vocals
Harry Stinson - harmony vocals on "Silver and Gold"
Dennis Wilson – background vocals
Curtis Young – background vocals

Production
Joe Bogan – additional engineering
Steve Buckingham – producer
Ray Bunch – string arrangements
Robert Charles – assistant engineer
Richard Dennison – vocal supervision
Javelina East – string recording
Chrissy Follmar – assistant engineer
Carlos Grier – digital editing
Larry Jeffries – assistant engineer
Brad Jones – assistant engineer
John Kunz – engineering assistant, mixing assistant
Sean Londin – assistant engineer
Gary Paczosa – engineering, mixing
John David Parker – assistant engineer
Dolly Parton – executive producer
Denny Purcell – mastering
Gary Smith – producer

Other personnel
David Blair – hair
Tony Chase – fashion, styling
Rachel Dennison – makeup
Sandy Gallin for Gallin-Morey Associates – management
Bill Johnson – art direction
Randee St. Nicholas – photographer
Jodi Lynn Miller – design assistant

Chart performance
Album

Album (Year-End)

Certifications

References

Dolly Parton albums
1991 albums
Albums produced by Steve Buckingham (record producer)
Columbia Records albums
Albums produced by Gary Smith (record producer)